Bakers Eddy are an Australian-based punk rock group. They released their debut studio album Love Boredom Bicycles on 25  March 2022.

Career
The group forming when they were 12-years-old in Wellington, New Zealand before relocating to Melbourne, Australia in 2017 where they live in a share house.

In November 2021, the group released "My Baby’s Like Cigarettes" and announced the forthcoming release of their debut studio album, Love Boredom Bicycles on 25  March 2022. Frontman Ciarann Babbington said in a statement, "The whole record is supposed to sound like the life of the party."

Discography

Studio albums

Extended plays

Singles

Notes

References

2009 establishments in Australia
Musical groups established in 2009
Musical groups from Melbourne